The depiction of LGBT characters in animated series in the 2020s changed from the 2010s, accelerating like never seen before, especially when it came to Western animation. The Owl House featured some of the first LGBTQ protagonists in a Disney show, while Kipo and the Age of Wonderbeasts had a prominent gay relationship not previously seen in animation. In adult animation, Magical Girl Friendship Squad and Helluva Boss broke ground, the former with a lesbian protagonist and the latter with two bisexual characters and one pansexual character. However, in 2020, She-Ra and the Princesses of Power and Steven Universe Future, both of which had various LGBTQ characters, ended. In anime, LGBTQ characters appeared in various productions, such as Adachi and Shimamura, Assault Lily Bouquet, and My Next Life as a Villainess: All Routes Lead to Doom!.

For a further understanding of how these LGBTQ characters fit into the overall history of animation, please read the History of LGBT characters in animation: 2020s page and its offshoots.

2020-present

The 2020s saw a blossoming of LGBTQ characters in animated series, including in children's animation, adult animation, young adult animation, and anime. This includes series such as Kipo and the Age of Wonderbeasts, The Owl House, Helluva Boss, Star Trek: Lower Decks, Adventure Time: Distant Lands, and The Great North. Anime such as Adachi and Shimamura,  Assault Lily Bouquet, My Next Life as a Villainess: All Routes Lead to Doom!, and Otherside Picnic also featured LGBTQ characters.

See also

 List of yuri anime and manga
 List of LGBT-related films by year
 List of animated films with LGBT characters

References

LGBT
2020s-related lists
Animated
LGBT 2020s
 2020s
 2020s
Animated